VIP Road is a major commercial road in the Indian city of Visakhapatnam. it connects to Siripuram to Resapuvanipalem. There are so many shopping hubs and restaurants  are located in VIP Road like Pantaloons Fashion & Retail, Shoppers Stop, Paradise Biryani.

References

Roads in Visakhapatnam
Neighbourhoods in Visakhapatnam
Shopping districts and streets in India